The LaRonde Mine is a gold mine in the Abitibi-Témiscamingue region  west of Val-d'Or in Quebec, Canada. 

LaRonde began commercial mining operations in 1988. The LaRonde mining complex has 3.8 million ounces of gold in provable and probable reserves. Previous operations at the LaRonde complex used open-pit mining methods. Presently, operations are primarily underground. The mine's Penna shaft – completed in March 2000 – has a depth of 2,250 metres.

It is expected that the mine will continue operations until 2032 and currently employs 1,042 workers.

LaRonde Zone 5 mine
The LaRonde Zone 5 mine (LZ5) was acquired by the company in 2003 and began commercial operation in June 2018 after approval for development in February 2017. The LZ5 mine was integrated into the LaRonde Complex in 2020. Agnico Eagle reports that LZ5 has provable and probable reserves of 852,000 ounces of gold.

The project primarily consists of gold-copper and zinc-silver mineralization.

Production 
The operation currently produces roughly 380,000 ounces of gold per year equating to 7,000-tonnes per day being processed.

The facility also treats concentrate pulp from the Goldex mill.

Agnico Eagle plans on an addition $12 million exploration project.

References

Gold mines in Canada
Mines in Quebec